HMS Swiftsure was the lead ship of her class of nuclear fleet submarines built for the Royal Navy. Entering service in 1973, she served until 1992.

Construction and design

Swiftsure was ordered on 3 November 1967, as the first of her class, and laid down at Vickers Armstrongs Barrow-in-Furness shipyard on 6 June 1969. She was launched on 7 September 1971 and commissioned on 17 April 1973. The cost of building Swiftsure was £37.1 million.

Service
Swiftsure became famous for her mission to acquire the acoustic signature of the Soviet aircraft carrier . Upon locating a new unique acoustic sound that indicated the Kievs presence, hid underneath her for several hours, with her raised periscope just 10 feet under the aircraft carrier's hull, allowing the crew to take photos and record the ship's acoustic signature. This was documented in 2013 as part of the BBC's Cold War season.

Swiftsure arrived in HMNB Devonport in January 1979 for her first scheduled refit. However, due to an industrial dispute the refit did not begin until April 1980, 15 months after the boat arrived into Devonport. Despite a statement in the House of Commons in mid-November 1981 that the refit would be completed by mid-1982 Swiftsures refit was eventually completed in March 1983, at a total cost of £85 million.

Swiftsure was due to enter a second refit in 1992, but instead she was decommissioned that year. The reason for the premature decommissioning is often cited as pressure hull damage suffered during sea trials although that is now thought to be incorrect; it is believed the reason for the boat's premature decommissioning was due to the finding of cracks in her reactor during a refit. Her nuclear core was safely removed in June 1992.

Since 1992, she has been stored afloat in the non-tidal basin at Rosyth dockyard, awaiting dismantling under MOD's Submarine Dismantling Project (SDP). She has undergone periodic dockings for re-preservation and maintenance inspections, the latest from August 2016 onwards. She will be the first, or 'demonstrator' submarine to undergo  Initial Dismantling through the SDP.

References

Publications

 

Swiftsure-class submarines
Ships built in Barrow-in-Furness
1971 ships